Mohamed Al-Fararjeh (born 16 October 1977) is a Jordanian taekwondo practitioner. He competed in the 2000 Summer Olympics.

References

External links
 
 
 
 

1977 births
Living people
Jordanian male taekwondo practitioners
Olympic taekwondo practitioners of Jordan
Taekwondo practitioners at the 2000 Summer Olympics
Asian Games medalists in taekwondo
Asian Games bronze medalists for Jordan
Taekwondo practitioners at the 1998 Asian Games
Medalists at the 1998 Asian Games
20th-century Jordanian people